George Cornwall Legh JP DL MP (30 August 1804 – 16 June 1877) was a 19th-century British Conservative Member of Parliament who represented Mid Cheshire.

Background and education
The head of an old Cheshire family, Legh was the eldest son of George John Legh of East Hall, High Legh, and Mary, daughter of John Blackburne. He was educated at Eton College and Christ Church, Oxford.

Legh served as a major in the 2nd Royal Cheshire Militia.  He was also a deputy lieutenant and justice of the peace for Cheshire and served as high sheriff of the county in 1838.

Political career
Legh was elected to House of Commons for Cheshire North in 1841, a seat he held until 1847 and again between 1848 and 1868, when it was abolished and he was instead returned for the newly created Mid Cheshire constituency, which he represented until 1873.

Family 
Legh married Louisa Charlotte, daughter of Edward Taylor, in 1828. There were no surviving children from their marriage. He died in June 1877, aged 72, and was succeeded in the family estate by descendants of his brother, later Barons Grey of Codnor.

References

External links 
 

1804 births
1877 deaths
Conservative Party (UK) MPs for English constituencies
UK MPs 1841–1847
UK MPs 1847–1852
UK MPs 1852–1857
UK MPs 1857–1859
UK MPs 1859–1865
UK MPs 1865–1868
UK MPs 1868–1874
People educated at Eton College
Alumni of Christ Church, Oxford
Deputy Lieutenants of Cheshire
High Sheriffs of Cheshire